The Porsche 911 (pronounced Nine Eleven or in ) is a two-door 2+2 high performance rear-engined sports car introduced in September 1964 by Porsche AG of Stuttgart, Germany. It has a rear-mounted flat-six engine and originally a torsion bar suspension. The car has been continuously enhanced through the years but the basic concept has remained unchanged. The engines were air-cooled until the introduction of the 996 series in 1998.

The 911 has been raced extensively by private and factory teams, in a variety of classes. It is among the most successful competition cars. In the mid-1970s, the naturally aspirated 911 Carrera RSR won world championship races including Targa Florio and the 24 Hours of Daytona. The 911-derived 935 turbo also won the 24 Hours of Le Mans in 1979. Porsche won the World Championship for Makes in 1976, 1977, 1978, and 1979 with 911-derived models.

In a 1999 poll to determine the Car of the Century, the 911 was fifth. It is one of two in the top five that had remained continuously in production (the original Beetle remained in production until 2003). The one millionth example was manufactured in May 2017 and is in the company's permanent collection.

911 nomenclature
Although Porsche has used internal code numbers for each series of the 911, all models have been marketed and sold as 911s. The model series and associated internal codes are as follows: 
 911 (1964–1989)
 930 (1975–1989) the turbocharged version
 964 (1989–1994)
 993 (1995–1998) the last air-cooled 911
 996 (1999–2004) all-new body and water-cooled engines
 997 (2005–2012)
 991 (2012–2019) all-new body
 992 (2019–)

A series letter is used by Porsche to indicate the revision for production cars, usually on an annual basis.

911s have also been categorized into families based on body styles or engine enhancements:

 911 Carrera: including the Carrera, Carrera S, Carrera 4, Carrera 4S, Carrera GTS, Carrera 4 GTS, Carrera T. All are available as cabriolets except the Carrera T.
 911 Targa: including the Targa 4, Targa 4S, Targa 4 GTS.
 911 Turbo: including the Turbo, Turbo S. All are available as cabriolets.
 GT3/GT3 RS: a track-focused version of the 911 Carrera with a naturally aspirated engine and rear wheel drive. No cabriolet variant has ever been produced to date. A grand touring version featuring comfort-oriented options is called the GT3 Touring, and is available for the 991 and 992 generations.
 GT2/GT2 RS: the highest performance derivative, a track-focused version based on the Turbo with rear wheel drive. No cabriolet version has ever been produced to date. Now available as an RS (Renn Sport) model only.

Air-cooled engines (1964–1998)

911, 911E, 911L, 911S, 911T

The 911 traces its roots to sketches drawn by Ferdinand "Butzi" Porsche in 1959. The Porsche 911 was developed as a more powerful, larger and a more comfortable replacement for the 356, the company's first model. The new car made its public debut at the 1963 Frankfurt Motor Show. The car was developed with the proof-of-concept twin-fan Type 745 flat-six engine, but the car presented at the auto show had a non-operational mockup of the single-fan 901 engine, receiving a working unit in February 1964.

It originally was designated as the "Porsche 901" (901 being its internal project number). A total of 82 cars were built as which were badged as 901s. However, French automobile manufacturer Peugeot protested on the grounds that in France it had exclusive rights to car names formed by three numbers with a zero in the middle. Instead of selling the new model with a different name in France, Porsche changed the name to 911. Internally, the cars' part numbers carried on the prefix 901 for years. Production began in September 1964, with the first 911s exported to the US in February 1965.

The first models of the 911 had a rear-mounted [1] Type 901/01 flat-6 engine, in the "boxer" configuration like the 356, the engine is air-cooled and displaces  as compared to the 356's four-cylinder,  unit. The car had four seats although the rear seats were small, thus it is usually called a 2+2 rather than a four-seater (the 356 was also a 2+2). A four or five-speed "Type 901" manual transmission was available. The styling was largely penned by Ferdinand "Butzi" Porsche, son of Ferdinand "Ferry" Porsche. Butzi Porsche initially came up with a notchback design with proper space for seating two rear passengers but Ferry Porsche insisted that the 356's successor was to use its fastback styling. 7 prototypes were built based on Butzi Porsche's original design and were internally called the Porsche 754 T7. Erwin Komenda, the leader of the Porsche car body construction department who initially objected, was also involved later in the design.

Production of the 356 ended in 1965, but there was still a market for a 4-cylinder car, particularly in the US. The 912, introduced in the same year, served as a direct replacement, offering the de-tuned version of 356 SC's 4-cylinder,  boxer four Type 616/36 engine inside the 911 bodywork with Type 901 four-speed manual transmission (a 5-speed manual transmission was optional).

Forged aluminum alloy wheels from Fuchsfelge, with a 5-spoke design, were offered for the first time.

In August 1967, the A series went into production with dual brake circuits and widened (5.5J-15) wheels still fitted with Pirelli Cinturato 165HR15 CA67 tyres., and the previously standard gasoline-burning heater became optional. The Targa (meaning "plate" in Italian) version was introduced. The Targa had a stainless steel-clad roll bar, as automakers believed that proposed rollover safety requirements by the US National Highway Traffic Safety Administration (NHTSA) would make it difficult for fully open convertibles to meet regulations for sale in the US, an important market for the 911. The name "Targa" came from the Targa Florio sports car road race in Sicily, Italy in which Porsche had several victories until 1973. The last win in the subsequently discontinued event was scored with a 911 Carrera RS against prototypes entered by Ferrari and Alfa Romeo. The road-going Targa was equipped with a removable roof panel and a removable plastic rear window (although a fixed glass version was offered from 1968).

The  911T was also launched in 1967 with Type 901/03 engine. The  model was renamed the 911L with Type 901/06 engine and ventilated front disc brakes. The brakes had been introduced on the previous 911S.

A clutchless semi-automatic Sportomatic model, composed of a torque converter, an automatic clutch, and the four-speed transmission was added in Autumn 1967.  It was canceled after the 1980 model year partly because of the elimination of a forward gear to make it a three-speed.

The B series went into production in August 1968, replacing the 911L model with 911E with fuel injection. It remained in production until July 1969. The 911E gained 185/70VR15 Pirelli Cinturato CN36, and 6J-15 wheels.

The C series was introduced in August 1969 with an enlarged 2.2-litre engine (84 mm bore x 66 mm stroke). The overall length of the car did not change, but the rear wheels were relocated further back. Fuel injection arrived for the 911S (901/10 engine) and for a new middle model, 911E (901/09 engine).

The D series was produced from Aug. 1970 to July 1971.

The E series for 1972–1973 model years (August 1971 to July 1972 production) consisted of the same models, but with a new, larger  engine. This is known as the "2.4 L" engine, despite its displacement being closer to 2.3 litres.
The 911E (Type 911/52 engine) and 911S (Type 911/53) used Bosch mechanical fuel injection (MFI) in all markets. For 1972 the 911T (Type 911/57) was carbureted, except in the US and some Asian markets where the 911T also came with (MFI) mechanical fuel injection (Type 911/51 engine) with power increase over European models (130 hp) to 140 hp commonly known as a 911T/E.

With power and torque increase, the 2.4-litre cars also got a newer, stronger transmission, identified by its Porsche type number 915. Derived from the transmission in the 908 race car, the 915 did away with the 901 transmission's "dog-leg" style first gear arrangement, opting for a traditional H pattern with first gear up to the left, second gear underneath first, etc. The E series had the unusual oil filler behind the right side door, with the dry sump oil tank relocated from behind the right rear wheel to the front of it in an attempt to move the center of gravity slightly forward for better handling. An extra oil filler/inspection flap was located on the rear wing, for this reason it became known as an "Oil Klapper", "Ölklappe" or "Vierte Tür (4th door)".

The F series (August 1972 to July 1973 production) moved the oil tank back to the original behind-the-wheel location. This change was in response to complaints that gas-station attendants often filled gasoline into the oil tank. In January 1973, US 911Ts were switched to the new K-Jetronic CIS (Continuous Fuel Injection) system from Bosch on Type 911/91 engine.

911S models also gained a small spoiler under the front bumper to improve high-speed stability. The 911 ST was produced in small numbers for racing (the production run for the ST lasted from 1970 to 1971). The cars had success at the Daytona 6 Hours, the Sebring 12 Hours, the 1000 km Nürburgring, and the Targa Florio.

911 Carrera RS (1973 and 1974)

RS stands for Rennsport in German, meaning race sport. The Carrera name was reintroduced from the 356 Carrera which had itself been named after Porsche's class victories in the Carrera Panamericana races in Mexico in the 1950s. The RS was developed to meet motorsport homologation requirements. Compared to a standard 911S, the Carrera 2.7 RS had a larger engine (2,687 cc) developing  with Bosch (Kugelfischer) mechanical fuel injection, revised and stiffened suspension, a "ducktail" rear spoiler, larger brakes, wider rear wheels and rear fenders, to fit 185/70VR15 & 215/60VR15 Pirelli Cinturato CN36 tyres.

For the 1974 IROC Championship (which started in December 1973), 1973 Carrera RSR models were fitted with the 3.0 engine and a flat "whale tail" in place of the ducktail spoiler along with wide body panels and large tyres.

Its price was almost twice that of the 2.7 RS, but it offered racing capability. The chassis was largely similar to that of the 1973 Carrera RSR and the braking system was from the 917 racing car.

The Carrera RSR 3.0 was sold to racing teams and scored wins in several major sports car races of the mid-1970s. Also, a prototype Carrera RSR Turbo (with 2.1-litre engine due to a 1.4x equivalency formula) came second at the 24 Hours of Le Mans in 1974 and won several major races, a significant event in that its engine would form the basis of many future Porsche attempts in sports car racing. This, and the earlier 917, was Porsche's commitment to turbocharger applications in its cars.

911 and 911S 2.7 (1973–1977)

There is a common misconception that all 911s built between 1974 and 1989 are 'G-series' cars. In fact, the G-series was only produced for the 1974 model year. It was followed by the H, J, K, and so on.

Model year 1974 (G Series. Aug. 1973 to July 1974 production)

Model year 1975 (H Series. Aug. 1974 to July 1975 production)

Model year 1976 (J Series. Aug. 1975 to July 1976 production)

Model year 1977 (K Series. Aug. 1976 to July 1977 production)

The 1974 model year brought many significant changes to the 911 to meet legislative requirements around the world for both impact safety and emissions. First, the engine size was increased to 2,687 cc achieving higher torque. Second, new impact bumpers conformed with low-speed protection requirements of US regulations. The engine remained a K-Jetronic 2.7-litre.

Carrera 2.7 MFI and CIS (1974–1976)
The Carrera 2.7 model built for all markets, except for the United States, used the  RS 911/83 engine with Bosch mechanical fuel injection pump from the 1973 Carrera RS. These Carrera 2.7 MFI models were built from 1974 until 1976 and were mechanically identical to the 1973 Carrera RS. The Carrera 2.7 model produced for the North American markets, often referred to as the Carrera 2.7 CIS, was powered by the same 2.7-litre engine as the 911S which produced . The initial Carrera 2.7 models had the same welded-on rear RS flares, before switching to the SC stamped style rear flares during the middle of the 1974 production year.

For the 1974 model year, the Carrera 2.7 was available with the "ducktail" rear spoiler first introduced with the 1973 Carrera RS. In the North American markets, the ducktail was standard equipment for the Carrera. All other markets the ducktail was optional, except for the home German market where the ducktail had been outlawed by the TÜV road homologation department. This led to the introduction of the whale tail rear spoiler, available as an option on the 1974-75 Carrera 2.7 models, as well as the newly introduced 930 Turbo.

The Carrera 2.7 was replaced by the Carrera 3.0 for the 1976 model year, except for a special run of 113 1976 Carrera 2.7 MFI coupés were built for the German market featuring the 911/83 RS engine, with an additional 20 narrow-bodied 1976 Carrera MFI 2.7 Targas being supplied to the Belgian Gendarmerie. The 1976 Carrera 2.7 MFI Sondermodells were the last mechanically fuel injected 911 produced by Porsche and still featured the 1973 RS engine.

912E (1976)

For the 1976 model year, the 912E was produced for the U.S. market. This was a 4-cylinder version of the 911 in the same manner as the 912 that had last been produced in 1969. It used the I-series chassis powered by the Volkswagen 2.0 engine also used in the Porsche 914 for 1973 through 1975 model years. 2,099 units were produced. The 912E was replaced by the front-engine Porsche 924 for the 1977 model year.

Carrera 3.0 (1976–1977)

For the 1976 model year, Porsche introduced the Carrera 3.0 with wide rear flares, optional whaletail, and a variety of other luxury options. It was available in all markets except North America. The Carrera 3.0 was fitted with a variation of the 930 Turbo's 2994 cc engine (minus the turbocharger). The engine (dubbed the 930/02) featured K-Jetronic CIS. It developed  in contrast to the older Carrera 2.7 MFI model's . The crankcase and gearbox housing were made of aluminium rather than magnesium for improved reliability. Magnesium cases were reviled for thermal expansion/contraction issues as engines grew in displacement and heat generation also increased.

The 911 Carrera 3.0 was produced in both targa (1,125 examples produced) and coupé (2,566) versions. The Carrera 3.0 was available with a manual gearbox (type 915) with 4 or 5 speeds as well as 3-speed automatic transmission (called the Sportomatic). Production totals were 3,691 manual cars and 58 Sportomatic cars.

930 Turbo and Turbo Carrera 3.0-litre (1975–1977)

For the 1975 model year, Porsche introduced the first production turbocharged 911. Although called the 930 Turbo (930 being its internal type number) in Europe, it was marketed as the 930 Turbo Carrera in North America. The body shape incorporated wide wheel-arches to accommodate the wide 205/50R15 & 225/50R15 Pirelli P7 tyres, and a large rear spoiler often known as a "whale tail" on the early cars (modified from the original 1974 IROC design). They were initially fitted with a 3.0-litre engine  and four-speed manual transmission.

Production of the first 400 units qualified the 930 for FIA Group 4 competition. With the racing version called the Porsche 934 of 1976 participating at the 24 Hours of Le Mans and other races including battles with the BMW 3.0 CSL "Batmobile". The FIA Group 5 version called Porsche 935 evolved from the 934. Fitted with a slope nose or "slant nose", the 500+ PS car was campaigned in 1976 by the factory, winning the world championship title. Private teams went on to win many races, like Le Mans in 1979, and continued to compete successfully with the car well into the 1980s until the FIA and IMSA rules were changed.

930 Turbo 3.3-litre (1978–1989)

To fit the intercooler a newly designed "tea-tray" tail spoiler replaced the earlier whale tail spoiler. Porsche dropped the "Carrera" nomenclature for the North American markets and the car was simply called the Porsche 911 Turbo worldwide. The larger engine helped reduce some of the turbo lag inherent in the earlier models.

In 1989, a 5-speed manual transmission became available for the 930. The 930 was replaced in 1990 with the 964 turbo featuring the same 3.3-litre engine. There have been turbocharged variants of each subsequent generation of 911 since then.

911SC (1978–1983)

In 1978, Porsche introduced the new version of the 911, called the '911SC'. Porsche reintroduced the SC designation for the first time since the 356SC (as distinguished from the race engined 356 Carrera). There was no Carrera version of the 911SC. According to modern-day Porsche literature and websites (there is no period reference to SC meaning anything) the "SC" stands for "Super Carrera". It featured a 3.0-litre aluminum engine with Bosch K-Jetronic fuel injection and a 5-speed 915 transmission. The move to an aluminum engine was to regain case reliability, something missing for many years with magnesium. In 1981 a Cabriolet concept car was introduced at the Frankfurt Motor Show. The convertible body design also featured four-wheel drive, although this was dropped in the production version. The first 911 Cabriolet debuted in late 1982, as a 1983 model. This was Porsche's first cabriolet since the 356 of the mid-1960s. A total of 4,214 were sold in its introductory year, despite its premium price relative to the open-top targa. Cabriolet versions of the 911 have been offered ever since.

In 1979, Porsche had made plans to replace the 911 with their new 928 company flagship. Sales of the 911 remained so strong, however, that Porsche revised its strategy and decided to inject new life into the 911 editions. 911 SC sales totaled 58,914 cars.

Peter W. Schutz (CEO Porsche AG 1981–1987) wrote:

Carrera 3.2 (1984–1989)

The replacement for the SC series came in 1984 as the 911 3.2 Carrera, reviving the Carrera name for the first time since 1977. This was the last iteration in the original 911 series, with all subsequent models featuring new body styling and new brake, electronic, and suspension technologies.

A new higher-displacement engine, a 3.2-litre horizontally opposed flat 6-cylinder unit, was utilized. At the time Porsche claimed it was 80% new. The new swept volume of 3,164 cc was achieved using the  bore (from the previous SC model) combined with the 1978 Turbo 3.3 crankshaft's  stroke. In addition, higher domed pistons increased the compression ratio from 9.8 to 10.3:1 (9.5:1 for the US market). New inlet manifold and exhaust systems were fitted. The 915 transmission was carried over from the SC series for the first three model years. In 1987, the Carrera got a new five-speed gearbox sourced from Getrag, model number G50 with proven BorgWarner synchronizers. This slightly heavier version also featured a hydraulically operated clutch.

Factory figures were more modest: 0– time of 6.3 seconds for the US version and 6.1 seconds for cars outside the American market.

The brake discs were increased in size to aid in more effective heat dissipation and improved oil-fed chain tensioners were fitted to the engine. To improve oil cooling, a finned cooler replaced the serpentine lines in the front passenger fender well. This was further improved in 1987, with the addition of a thermostatically controlled fan.

Driving refinement and motor reliability were improved with an upgrade of the fuel and ignition control components to an L-Jetronic with Bosch Motronics 2 DME (Digital Motor Electronics system). An improvement in fuel efficiency was due to the DME providing a petrol cut-off on the overrun.

Three basic models were available – coupé, targa and cabriolet. The Carrera is almost indistinguishable from the SC with the external clue being the front fog lights that were integrated into the front valance. Only cosmetic changes were made during the production of the Carrera, with a redesigned dashboard featuring larger air conditioning vents appearing in 1986.

In 1984, Porsche also introduced the M491 option. Officially called the Supersport in the UK, it was commonly known as the "Turbo-Look". It was a style that resembled the 930 Turbo with wide wheel arches and the distinctive "tea tray" tail. It featured the stiffer suspension shared with the Turbo and the superior Turbo braking system as well as the wider Turbo wheels. Sales of the Turbo-Look were high for its first two years in the United States because the desirable 930 was not available. 
3,663 were sold until 1989. The Turbo-Look, received official title in the sales lists, as the 930 Chassis option starting in model year 1984. The order was now possible without the special wish department (as previously). At first, only available for the Coupé, some cabriolets were still ordered with Turbo-Look items without having option code M491 in the internal data sheets (cardex). For these cars the "Sonderwunsch" dept. was once more responsible. From model year 1985 the Turbo-Look option could be ordered on all three models; Coupé, Cabriolet and Targa produced together with the narrow body on the same production line.

The Turbo-Look option package contained:
Front fenders of 930 Turbo; which, were attached the same way as the Turbo, first by welding flares to the narrow fender, then from model year 1986 a new, widened fender as a one piece stamped steel part was developed.
Side rear 930 widened fenders at the back; which, was attached the same way as the Turbo, first by welding flares to the narrow body, then from model year 1986 a new, widened quarter panel as one piece stamped steel part was manufactured.
Porsche service information reads: "The visible from inside weld seam is omitted. The drawing part is now manufactured in one piece"
The 930 front apron with Black rubber elastic spoiler with integrated front driving lights.
The 930 Turbo rear wing with the black rubber elastic lip of the Porsche 930 3.3 Intercooled model.
One could cancel the front spoiler and back spoiler - first without a change in price; however, later the package price decreased by about 2000 - DM. Such vehicles were documented, in addition, with the option M470.
The complete brake assembly of the 930 Turbo 3.3, derived for the Porsche 917.
Axle brackets and anti-sway bars of the Turbo 3.3 (first 20 mm then 22 mm rear, as well as 23 mm in front).
FUCHS Magnesium with dimensions: Front: 7x16 and Rear 9x16 – with Tires 205 55 x 16 and 245 50 x 16 (from Model year 1986). 
The Turbo-Look option package did not include:
Bilstein shocks/struts of the Turbo – Instead the Turbo-Look used the Carrera Boge units.
The 930 tie rods of the Turbo. There was no independent chassis number given for the M491/M490 optioned vehicles.

In 1985, Porsche introduced the first Carrera Club Sport prototype with the identification number WP0ZZZ91ZF100848. Later on in that year, a 911 Club Sport Row (Rest Of World) with the identification number WP0ZZZ91ZFS101166 was special ordered for a Porsche driver that was particularly inspired by the CS prototype on the track. From 1987 to September 1989, Porsche decided to produced 340 units for their customers that wanted a track inspired road car, The 911 Carrera Club Sport (CS) (option M637), is a reduced weight version of the standard Carrera purposely built for club racing, it gained engine and suspension modifications. The CS had a blueprinted engine with hollow intake valves and a higher rev limit, deletion of: all power options, sunroof (except one unit), air conditioning (except two units), radio, rear seat, undercoating, sound insulation, rear wiper, door pocket lids, fog lamps, front hood locking mechanism, engine and luggage compartment lights, lockable wheel nuts and even the rear lid "Carrera" logo, all in order to save an estimated  in weight. With the exception of CS cars delivered to the UK, all are identifiable by the "CS Club Sport" decal on the left front fender and came in a variety of colors, some special ordered. Some U.S. CS cars did not have the decal installed by the dealer; however, all have a "SP" stamp on the crankcase and cylinder head. The UK cars were all finished "Grand Prix White" with a red "Carrera CS" decal on each side of the car and red wheels. Although the CS was well received by the club racers, because it cost more than the standard 911, but had fewer comfort features. According to Porsche Club of America and Porsche Club Great Britain CS Registers, 21 are documented as delivered to the U.S. in 1988 with 7 in 1989, one to Canada in 1988 and 53 to the United Kingdom from 1987 to 1989.

In 1988, Porsche produced 875 examples of the CE or Commemorative Edition 911 Carrera in coupe, targa and cabriolet variants to mark the production of the 250,000th 911. Distinguishing features include special diamond blue metallic paint with color-matched Fuchs wheels, front and rear spoilers, and interior carpets and leather. These cars also featured Dr. Ferdinand Porsche's signature embroidered on the seats in the headrest area. Of the 875 examples produced, only 300 were imported to the US (120 coupes, 100 cabrio's and 80 Targa's), 250 were sold in Germany, 50 went to the UK, and the remainder to other countries.

For 1989, Porsche produced the 25th Anniversary Special Edition model to mark the 25th year of 911 production. The 1989 Porsche brochure lists production of 500 U.S. market cars, of which 300 were coupés (240 in silver metallic paint and 60 in satin black metallic), and 200 cabriolet models (160 in silver and 40 in black). All had "silk grey" leather with black accent piping and silk grey velour carpeting. Included were body color Fuchs wheels in 6x16 (front) and 8x16 (rear), stitched leather console with an outside temperature gauge and a CD or cassette holder, a limited-slip differential, and a short shifting gear lever, as well as small bronze "25th Anniversary Special Edition" badges.

The 911 Speedster (option M503), a low-roof version of the Cabriolet which was evocative of the 356 Speedster of the 1950s, was produced in limited numbers (2,104 units) starting in January 1989 until July 1989 as both a narrow body car and a Turbo-look. The narrow version production was 171 units. The Speedster started as a design under  in 1983 but was not manufactured until six years later. It was a two-seat convertible that featured a low swept windshield.

Total production of the 911 3.2 Carrera series was 76,473 cars (35,670 coupé, 19,987 cabrio, 18,468 targa).

According to the manufacturer in 2014, an estimate of around 150,000 of the 911 cars from the model years 1964 to 1989 are still on the road at that date.

964 Series (1989–1993)

For 1989 the 911 underwent a major evolution with the introduction of the Type 964. With technologies from the 959 flagship model, this would be an important car for Porsche, since the world economy was undergoing recession and the company could not rely on its image alone. It was launched as the Carrera 4, the "4" indicating four-wheel-drive, demonstrating the company's commitment to engineering. Drag coefficient was down to 0.32. A rear spoiler deployed at high speed, preserving the purity of design when the vehicle was at rest. The chassis was redesigned overall. Coil springs, ABS brakes and power steering made their debut. The rear-wheel-drive version, the Carrera 2, arrived a year later.

The 964 incarnation of the 911 Turbo returned in 1990 after an absence from the price lists. At first, it used a refined version of the 3.3 L engine of the previous Turbo, but two years later a turbocharged engine based on the 3.6 L engine of the other 964 models was introduced.

In 1990, Porsche introduced the ahead-of-its-time Tiptronic automatic transmission in the 964 Carrera 2, featuring adaptive electronic management and full manual control. The 964 was one of the first cars in the world offered with dual airbags standard (from 1991), the first being the 944 Turbo (from 1987).

In 1992, Porsche re-introduced a limited-edition RS model, inspired by the 1973 Carrera RS and emissions-legal in Europe only. In 1993, appeals from American customers resulted in Porsche developing the RS America of which 701 units were built. In 1994, the RS America returned with rear seats. A total of 84 RS America cars were made in 1994. However, while European RS was a homologation special, RS America was an option delete variant of the regular model. The RS 3.8 of 1993 had Turbo-style bodywork, a larger fixed whale tail in place of the electronically operated rear spoiler, and a   engine.

Since the RS/RS America was intended as a no-compromise, higher performance version of the 964, there were four factory options available: a limited-slip differential, AM/FM cassette stereo, air conditioning, and a sunroof. The interior was more basic than a standard 911 as well; for example, the interior door panels lacked the armrests and door pockets and had a simple pull strap for the opening mechanism.

964 Turbo (1990–1994)

In 1990 Porsche introduced a Turbocharged version of the 964 series. This car is sometimes mistakenly called 965 (this type number actually referred to a stillborn project that would have been a hi-tech turbocharged car in the vein of the 959). With the 993 on the way, this car was produced through 1994 and remains rather rare.

993 Series (1994–mid 1998)

The 911 was again revised for model year 1994 under the internal name Type 993. This car was significant as it was the final incarnation of the air-cooled 911 first introduced in 1964.  Most enthusiasts and collectors consider the 993 to be the best of the air-cooled 911 series.  As Car & Driver noted, "Porsche's version of the Goldilocks tale is the 993-generation 911, the one many Porschephiles agree that the company got just right," with an "ideal blend of technology and classic 911 air-cooled heritage."  Porsche itself refers to the 993 as "a significant advance, not just from a technical, but also a visual perspective." "993s especially [are] widely regarded as the best the 911 ever got."

The exterior featured all-new front and rear ends. The revised bodywork was smoother, having a noticeably more aerodynamic front end somewhat reminiscent of the 959. Styling was by Englishman Tony Hatter under the supervision of design chief Harm Lagaay and was completed in 1991.

Along with the revised bodywork, mechanically the 993 also featured an all-new multilink rear suspension that improved the car's ride and handling. This rear suspension was largely derived from the stillborn Porsche 989's rear multilink design and served to rectify the problems with earlier models' tendency to oversteer if the throttle or brakes were applied mid-corner. These modifications also reduced previous 911's lift-off oversteer problems to a much more moderate degree.

The new suspension, along with chassis refinements, enabled the car to keep up dynamically with the competition. The 993 was the first Porsche to debut variable-length intake runners with the "Varioram" system on 1996 models. This addressed the inherent compromise between high-rpm power production and low-rpm torque production and was one of the first of its kind to be employed on production vehicles. However, the Varioram version with its OBD II had issues with carbon deposits, resulting in failed smog tests. This caused expensive repairs and made comparisons with the 1995 car (with OBD I and just 12 hp less) inevitable. Meanwhile, a new four-wheel-drive system was introduced as an option in the form of the Carrera 4, the rear-wheel-drive versions simply being called Carrera or C2.

The Targa open-topped model also made a return, this time with a large glass roof that slid under the rear window. The expensive air-cooled 993 Targa had a limited production run between 1996 and 1998.  [Production numbers: 1996: US/Can: 462 ROW: 1980, 1997: US/Can: 567 ROW: 1276, 1998: US/Can: 122 (100 Tiptronic / 22 Manual)]

As an investment, the 1997 and 1998 Carrera S version has proven the most desirable (apart from even rarer models such as the RS and Turbo S). "Many find that they are the best looking 911 there is and used prices have always seemed to reflect this. They command a hefty premium in today's market and the very best example wide body cars can be priced more than the higher mileage Turbos."  Of the widebody 993 series, "The purists will want 2 wheel drive and nothing else will do." Similarly, purists will insist upon the manual transmission over the automatic "Tiptronic" version; this is even more true in the case of the 993 as compared with other models, because Porsche 993s were the first production model (apart from the 959 flagship sports car) to feature a 6-speed manual transmission. The C2S wide-body 993 models are in scarce supply, with none built in 1995 or 1996, and just 759 units made for North America in 1997, with a final supply of 993 in 1998, for a total of 1,752 C2S examples overall.

993 Turbo (1995–1997)

A Turbocharged version of the 993 was launched in 1995 and became the first standard production Porsche with twin turbochargers and the first 911 Turbo to be equipped with permanent all-wheel-drive (the homologated GT2 version based on the Turbo retained RWD). The similarity in specification and in performance levels inspired several comparison road tests with the 959. The 3.6 L twin-turbocharged M64/60 engine is rated at ). The performance was outstanding at the time, as 0 to  has been measured at 3.2 seconds, and the braking was even more impressive in 2.3 seconds from the same speed. The differences were striking - the 959 had a much smaller engine, sequential turbocharging and a computer-controlled all wheel drive system. The 993 turbo had parallel turbochargers, 3.6 litres of displacement, and a viscous coupling for the center differential in the AWD drivetrain. The turbo was only produced in 1996 and 1997 model years. The main difference was that the ECU in the 1996 model year could not be flashed for an upgrade, while the 1997 could. Additionally, the 1996 year had Porsche crested centre caps on the wheels, while the 1997 had turbo inscribed. Another difference is the motion sensor and map lights above the interior rear view mirror on the 1997 while the 1996 had no such devices.

In 1997, Porsche introduced a limited run of 183 units of the Sport version of the 993 turbo dubbed the turbo S. With  over the regular Turbo's , features include a scoop on the side right behind the doors for engine cooling and vents on the whale tail rear spoiler. Aside from an upgraded ECU mapping, a centre oil cooler behind the centre air intake at the front bumper was added.

Water-cooled engines (1998–present)

996 (1999–2005)

The Type 996 introduced in 1998 represented two major changes for the venerable 911 lineage: a water-cooled flat-6 engine replaced the popular air-cooled engine used in the 911 for 34 years and the body shell received its first major re-design. Changing to a water-cooled engine was controversial with Porsche traditionalists, who noted this as the end of the 'true' 911.

The 996 styling shared its front end with Porsche's mid engine entry-level Boxster. Pinky Lai's work on the exterior won international design awards between 1997 and 2003.

The Carrera variant had a 0.30 coefficient of drag. The interior was criticized for its plainness and its lack of relationship to prior 911 interiors, although this came largely from owners of older 911s.

The Type 996 spawned over a dozen variations, including an all-wheel-drive Carrera 4 and Carrera 4S (the latter which had a 'Turbo look' in facelift form) models, the club racing-oriented GT3 and GT3 RS instead of a Carrera RS variant and the forced-induction 996 Turbo and GT2. The Turbo, which was four-wheel-drive and had a twin-turbocharged engine, often made appearances in magazines' lists of the best cars on sale.

The Carrera and Carrera 4 underwent revisions for the 2002 model year, receiving clear lens front and rear indicator lights which were first seen on the Turbo version two years earlier. This allowed the 911 to be more distinguishable from the Boxster. A mildly revised front fascia was also introduced, though the basic architecture remained.

Engine displacement was 3.4 L and power 
output was  featuring a change to an "integrated dry sump" design and variable valve timing.

The folding roof mechanism on the convertible variants required 19 seconds for operation. It could also be raised manually by means of an electric switch.

Starting from the models with water-cooled engines, all variants of the 911 Carrera do not come with rear limited-slip differential, except the 40th Anniversary 911, GT2, GT3 and Turbo. The exception would be for MY1999 where the limited-slip differential was available as option code 220.

996 GT3 (1999–2004)

Porsche introduced a road-legal GT3 version of the 996 series which was derived from the company's racing car used in the GT3 class racing. Simply called GT3, the car featured lightweight materials including thinner windows and deletion of the rear seats. The GT3 was a lighter and more focused design with an emphasis on handling and performance, a concept that dates back to the 1973 Carrera RS. The suspension ride height was lowered and tuned for responsiveness over compliance and comfort. These revisions improved handling and steering. Of more significance was the engine used in the GT3. Instead of using a version of the water-cooled units found in other 996 models, the naturally aspirated engine was derived from the 911 GT1 '98 sports-prototype racing car and featured lightweight materials which enabled the engine to have higher rpm.

The engine used was a naturally aspirated  flat-six rather than the engine from the pre-facelift and revised Carrera.

996 Turbo (2001–2005)

In 2000, Porsche launched the turbocharged version of the Type 996 for the 2001 model year. Also like its predecessor, the new Turbo was only available with all-wheel drive. Later on toward the end of the 996 life cycle, the Turbo S nameplate also returned with the debut of the cabriolet variant as well. The Turbo S boasted even more power—  and — than the standard Turbo courtesy of the X50 package being standard. The Turbo S was limited to 1,500 units worldwide.

The styling was more individual than the previous generations of the Turbo. Along with the traditional wider rear wing, the 996 Turbo had different front lights and bumpers when compared to the Carrera and Carrera 4. The rear bumper had air vents reminiscent of those on the 959 and there were large vents on the front bumper.

997 (2004–2013)

The 996 was replaced with the 997 in 2004, for the 2005 model year. It retains the 996's basic profile, with an even lower 0.28 drag coefficient, but draws on the 993 for detailing. In addition, the new headlights revert to the original bug-eye design from the teardrop scheme of the 996. Its interior is also similarly revised, with strong links to the earlier 911 interiors while at the same time looking fresh and modern. The 997 shares less than a third of its parts with the outgoing 996, but is still technically similar to it.

In late 2005, Porsche introduced the all-wheel-drive versions to the 997 lineup. Carrera 4 models (both Carrera 4 and Carrera 4S) were announced as 2006 models. The  acceleration time for the Carrera 4S with the  engine equipped with a manual transmission was reported at 4.8 seconds. The 997 lineup includes both 2- and 4-wheel-drive variants, named Carrera and Carrera 4 respectively. The Targas (4 and 4S), released in November 2006, are 4-wheel-drive versions that divide the difference between the coupés and the cabriolets with their dual, sliding glass tops.

The 997 received a larger air intake in the front bumper, new headlights, new rear taillights, new clean-sheet design direct fuel injection engines, and the introduction of a dual-clutch gearbox called PDK for the 2009 model year. They were also equipped with Bluetooth support.

The change to the 7th generation (991) took place in the middle of the 2012 model year. A 2012 Porsche 911 can either be a 997 or a 991, depending on the month of the production.

997 Turbo

It has VTG (variable turbine geometry), that combines the low-rev boost and quick responses of a small turbocharger with the high-rev power of a larger turbocharger. It also offers higher fuel efficiency compared to the 996 Turbo.
The 997 Turbo features a new all-wheel-drive system, similar to the one found on the Cayenne. The new PTM (Porsche Traction Management) system incorporates a clutch-based system that varies the amount of torque to the wheels to avoid tyre slippage. According to Porsche, redirecting torque to control oversteer or understeer results in neutral handling as well as greatly improved performance in all weather conditions.

For the face lifted 2010 model year 911 Turbo, known internally as the 997.2 (as opposed to the 997.1 2007-2009 model years), launched in August 2009, the PTM system was tweaked to give a more rearward power bias. The paddle shifters for the PDK double-clutch gearbox debuted on the Turbo. The turbo uses a different engine. The previous water-cooled turbo models (996 and 997) measured 3,600cc. This new engine measures  and was first developed for the Carrera that was launched in 2008. The variable-vane twin turbochargers have also been reworked to increase responsiveness, and the intercooler and fuel system were uprated. The steering wheel also houses a display showing when Sport, Sport Plus and launch control have been selected through the optional Sport Chrono package.

As with the 996 Turbo, the car featured distinctive styling cues over the Carrera models including front LED driving/parking/indicator lights mounted on a horizontal bar across the air intakes. The traditional rear wing is a variation of the 996 bi-plane unit.

A new 911 Turbo S was set for production in 2010. It is a fully optioned Porsche 911 Turbo with a PDK gearbox and sports exhaust as standard.

997 GT3

The 911 GT3 was added to the 997 lineage on 23 February 2006. It was at that time crowned "the best handling car in America" by Motor Trend.

997 GT3 RS

The 911 GT3 RS was announced in early 2006 as a homologation version of the GT3 RSR racing car for competition events like Sebring and the 24 Hours of Le Mans.

The drivetrain of the RS is based on the 911 GT3, except for the addition of a lightweight flywheel and closer gear ratios for further improved response under acceleration. Unlike the GT3, the RS is built on the body and chassis of the 911 Carrera 4 and Turbo, and accordingly has a wider rear track for better cornering characteristics on the track.

Visually, the RS is distinguished by its distinctive colour scheme – bright orange or green with black accents, which traces its roots to the iconic Carrera RS of 1973.  The plastic rear deck lid is topped by a wide carbon-fibre rear wing. The front airdam has been fitted with an aero splitter to improve front downforce and provide more cooling air through the radiator.

The European version of the RS is fitted with lightweight plexiglass rear windows and a factory-installed roll cage.

Production of the first generation 997 GT3 RS ended in 2009. An estimated 413 units were delivered to the US and the worldwide production run is estimated to be under 2,000 vehicles.

Other characteristics include low centre of gravity, a large rear wing and an aerodynamically optimised body. The lateral front air deflection vanes, a first on a production Porsche, increase downforce on the front axle. Aided by a steeply inclined rear wing, aerodynamic forces exert an additional 190 kg, enhancing the 911 GT3 RS 4.0's grip to the tarmac. The GT3 RS 4.0 weighs .

997 GT2

The Type 996 911 GT2 was superseded by the Type 997 GT2 in 2007. The new car was announced on 16 July of that year but was launched during the 62nd Frankfurt Motor Show, held every other year in Frankfurt, Germany. It arrived in dealerships from November 2007.

It has a 6-speed manual transmission and is rear wheel drive. This makes it the first street-legal 911 to exceed  barrier, with the exception of the 1998 911 GT1 road car (which is broadly considered not to be a true 911 due to its mid-mounted engine).

The GT2 made an appearance on Top Gear, where it had a lap time of 1:19.5, faster than a Carrera GT by .3 of a second.

Its appearance differs slightly from its sister-car, the 911 (997) Turbo, in a few ways. It does not have fog lights in the front bumper, it has a revised front lip, it has a different rear wing (with two small air scoops on either side), and it has a different rear bumper (now featuring titanium exhaust pipes).

The 997 GT2 is also different from the 997 Turbo in that it is rear-wheel-drive rather than all-wheel-drive.

997 GT2 RS

On 4 May 2010, an RS variant was announced to German dealers in Leipzig.

Sport Classic

Unveiled at the 2009 Frankfurt Auto Show, the Sport Classic is a limited (250 units- all sold in under 48 hours) version of 911 Carrera S coupé, inspired by the 1973 Carrera RS 2.7. The engine is rated at  via newly developed resonance intake manifold with 6 vacuum-controlled switching flaps. It includes 6-speed manual transmission, double-dome roof,  wider rear fenders, SportDesign front apron with a spoiler lip and a fixed 'duck tail' rear wing (similar to the one found on the 1973 Carrera RS 2.7), PCCB Porsche Ceramic Composite Brakes,  lower PASM sports suspension, mechanical rear axle differential, 19-inch black Fuchs wheels, Porsche Exclusive woven leather seats and door panels, dashboard with Espresso Nature natural leather upholstery, and a specially developed Sport Classic Grey body colour.

Carrera GTS
For the 2011 model year, Porsche introduced the first-ever GTS model for the 911. Designed as a driver's car, the GTS was more powerful than the S, better handling via a bespoke suspension design, and positioned as a more street-friendly alternative to the GT3, Porsche's track-focused 911 variant. The GTS featured race-inspired center lock wheels, unique styling including a Sport Design front bumper, special rear bumper, blackout trim, side skirts borrowed from the GT2 model, brushed stainless steel "Carrera GTS" door sills and Alcantara trim. Many GTS' were ordered with the Alcantara delete, instead being built with leather. The GTS was very rare in that it was a rear wheel drive Wide-Body design (44 mm wider than a standard 911), 20 mm lower and offered 408 HP (versus 385 HP for the S) like the similar, limited volume Sport Classic and the Speedster. Porsche built approximately 2,265 total GTS models for the world market, as well as a handful designated as 2012 models. The enthusiastic reception the GTS model received from both the motoring press and consumers, convinced Porsche to make the GTS a staple of the 911 line beginning in 2015, with the "type 991" 911 successor.

Speedster

In 2011, Porsche added a new 911 Speedster in a limited series of only 356 units to the 997 lineage, the number of cars produced recalling the iconic car of the 1950s. It was the third 911 Speedster produced, the other two being from the 930 and 964 generations. Only two colours were offered, Pure Blue (which was developed specifically for the Speedster) and Carrara White. (Paint To Sample versions were produced in very limited numbers and upon special request from "loyal customers".)

The Speedster featured a windscreen 70mm shorter than the standard 997 cabriolet while maintaining the same rake angle.

991 Series (2011 – 2019)

The 991 introduced in 2011 for the 2012 model year is an entirely new platform, only the third since the original 911. Porsche revealed basic information on the new Carrera and Carrera S models on 23 August 2011. The Carrera is powered by a  3.4-litre engine. Overhangs are trimmed and the rear axle moves rearward at roughly  towards the engine (made possible by new 3-shaft transmissions whose output flanges are moved closer to the engine). There is a wider front track ( wider for the Carrera S). The design team for the 991 was headed by Michael Mauer.

At the front, the new 991 has wide-set headlights that are more three-dimensional. The front fender peaks are a bit more prominent, and wedgy directionals now appear to float above the intakes for the twin coolant radiators. The stretched rear 3/4 view has changed the most, with a slightly more voluminous form and thin taillights capped with the protruding lip of the bodywork. The biggest and main change in the interior is the center console, inspired by the Carrera GT and adopted by the Panamera.

The 991 is the first 911 to use a predominantly aluminium construction. This means that even though the car is larger than the outgoing model, it is still up to  lighter. The reduced weight and increased power means that both the Carrera and Carrera S are appreciably faster than the outgoing models.

Apart from the reworked PDK transmission, the new 991 is also equipped with an industry-first 7-speed manual transmission. On vehicles produced in late 2012 (2013 model year) Rev Matching is available on the 7-speed manual transmission when equipped with the Sport Chrono package. Rev-Matching is a new feature with the manual transmission that blips the throttle during downshifts (if in Sport Plus mode). Also, the 7th gear cannot be engaged unless the car is already in 5th or 6th gear.

One of Porsche's primary objectives with the new model was to improve fuel economy as well as increase performance. In order to meet these objectives, Porsche introduced a number of new technologies in the 911. One of the most controversial of these is the introduction of electromechanical power steering instead of the previous hydraulic steering. This steering helps reduce fuel consumption, but some enthusiasts feel that the precise steering feedback for which the 911 is famous is reduced with the new system. The cars also feature an engine stop/start system that turns the engine off at red lights, as well as a coasting system that allows the engine to idle while maintaining speed on downhill gradients on highways. This allows for up to a 16% reduction in fuel consumption and emissions over the outgoing models.

The new cars also have a number of technologies aimed at improving handling. The cars include a torque vectoring system (standard on the Carrera S and optional on the Carrera) which brakes the inner wheel of the car when going into turns. This helps the car to turn in quicker and with more precision. The cars also feature hydraulic engine mounts (which help reduce the inertia of the engine when going into turns) as part of the optional sports chrono package. Active suspension management is standard on the Carrera S and optional on the Carrera. This helps improve ride quality on straights while stiffening the suspension during aggressive driving. The new 991 is also equipped with a new feature called Porsche Dynamic Chassis Control (PDCC). Porsche claims that this new feature alone has shaved 4 seconds off the standard car's lap time around the Nürburgring. PDCC helps the car corner flat and is said to improve high-speed directional stability and outright lateral body control, but according to several reviews, the car is more prone to understeer when equipped with this new technology.

In January 2013, Porsche introduced the all-wheel-drive variants of the Carrera models. The '4' and '4S' models are distinguishable by wider tyres, marginally wider rear body-work and a red-reflector strip that sits in between the tail-lights. The 4 and 4S models are equipped with an all-new variable all-wheel-drive system that sends power to the front wheels only when needed, giving the driver a sense of being in a rear-wheel-drive 911.

A rear-wheel steering system has also been incorporated on the Turbo models that steers the rear wheels in the opposite direction at low speeds or the same direction at high speeds to improve handling. During low-speed maneuvers, this has the virtual effect of shortening the wheelbase, while at high speeds, it is virtually extending the wheelbase for higher driving stability and agility.

In January 2014, Porsche introduced the new model year 2015 Targa 4 and Targa 4S models. These new models come equipped with an all-new roof technology with the original Targa design, now with an all-electric cabriolet roof along with the B-pillar and the glass 'dome' at the rear.

In September 2015, Porsche introduced the second generation of 991 Carrera models at the Frankfurt Motor Show. Both Carrera and Carrera S models break with previous tradition by featuring a 3.0-litre turbocharged 6-cylinder boxer engine, marking the first time that a forced induction engine has been fitted to the base models within the 911 range.

991 GT3

Porsche introduced the 991 GT3 at the Geneva Motor Show in 2013. The 991 GT3 features a new 3.8 litre direct fuel injection (DFI) flat-six engine developing  at 8,250 rpm, a Porsche Doppelkupplung (PDK) double-clutch gearbox and rear-wheel steering. The engine is based on the unit fitted in the 991 Carrera S, but shares only a few common parts. All other components, particularly the crankshaft and valve train, were specially adapted or developed for the 991 GT3. The dual-clutch gearbox is another feature specially developed for the 991 GT3, based on sequential manual transmissions used in racing cars.

Porsche unveiled the facelifted 991.2 GT3 at the 2017 Geneva Motor Show. Extensive changes were made to the engine allowing a 9,000 rpm redline from the 4.0 litre flat-six engine. Porsche's focus was on reducing internal friction to improve throttle response. Compared to the 991.1, the rear spoiler is higher and located further back to be more effective. There is a new front spoiler and changes to the rear suspension. The 991.2 GT3 brought back the choice between a manual transmission or PDK dual-clutch transmission. A touring version was also introduced which comes standard with the comfort package and the manual transmission along with the deletion of the fixed rear wing and employing an electronically operated rear wing instead.

991 GT3 RS

Porsche launched the Renn Sport version of the 911 GT3 at the Geneva Motor Show in 2015. Compared to the 911 GT3, the front fenders are now equipped with louvers above the wheels and the rear fenders now include Turbo-like intakes, rather than an intake below the rear wing. The roof is made from magnesium. The interior includes full bucket seats (based on the carbon seats of the 918 Spyder), carbon-fibre inserts, lightweight door handles and the Club Sport Package as standard (a bolted-on roll cage behind the front seats, preparation for a battery master switch, and a six-point safety harness for the driver and fire extinguisher with mounting bracket). The transmission is PDK only. The car accelerates from 0– in 3.4 seconds (0.6 seconds quicker than the 997 GT3 RS 4.0) and 0– in 10.9 seconds. The 991 GT3 RS also comes with functions such as declutching by "paddle neutral" — comparable to pressing the clutch with a conventional manual gearbox – and a Pit Speed limiter button. As with the 911 GT3, a rear-axle steering and Porsche Torque Vectoring Plus with fully variable rear axle differential lock are available as standard.

In February 2018, Porsche introduced a facelifted GT3 RS model to continue their updates for the 991 generation of the 911. A Weissach package was available that included additional carbon fibre body and interior parts as well as magnesium wheels and stiffer suspension settings is available as an option.

911 R

In 2016, Porsche unveiled a limited production 911 R based on the GT3 RS. Production was limited to 991 units worldwide.

991 GT2 RS

The high-performance GT2 version made a return to the 991 lineage but now as an RS variant only with no standard variant being produced, unlike the previous generations. It was initially unveiled at the 2017 E3 along with the announcement of the Forza Motorsport 7 video game.
The car was officially launched by Porsche at the 2017 Goodwood Festival of Speed along with the introduction of the 911 Turbo S Exclusive Series. Unlike the previous GT2 versions, this car is fitted with a 7-speed PDK transmission to handle the excessive torque produced from the engine.

The car has a roof made of magnesium, front lid, front and rear spoilers and boot lid made of carbon, front and rear apron made of lightweight polyurethane, rear and side windows made of polycarbonate and features a titanium exhaust system.

These include the roof, the anti-roll bars and the coupling rods on both axles made out of carbon-fiber while the package also includes a set of light-weight magnesium wheels.

Speedster (2019)

At the 2018 Paris Motor Show held in October on the occasion of the 70th-anniversary celebration of the marque, Porsche unveiled the Speedster variant of the 991 generation for the 911, as a concept. The car also features the signature "hump" shaped double-bubble roof cover along with a shorter windshield frame, side window glass and the analogue roof folding mechanism retaining the "Talbot" wing mirrors and the central fuel cap from the 911 Speedster concept unveiled earlier at the Goodwood Festival of Speed harking back to its use on the 356 Speedster. Other highlights include a leather interior with perforated seats, red tinted daytime running lights, carbon fibre fenders, engine cover and hood and stone guards. Production began in the first half of 2019 and be limited to 1,948 units in honour of the year in which the 356 "Number 1" gained its operating license. The final production version of the Speedster was unveiled at the 2019 New York Auto Show in April and dropped the "Talbot" wing mirrors in favour of standard 991 wing mirrors. The speedster was available for sale in May 2019.

992 Series (2019–present)

The 2019 version of the 911, under the internal name Type 992, made its debut at the 2018 Los Angeles Auto Show. During the actual debut, a presentation of the history of the 911 series was shown, along with a lineup of 911s from different generations.

On 30 July 2019 Porsche started marketing the non 'S' model of the new 992. The exterior is almost identical to the 991 'S's models with the exception of having 19" wheels front and 20" wheels at the rear, compared to the 'S' Models 20" front and 21" rear. , Porsche offers the Carrera and Carrera S versions (offered with all-wheel-drive 4 and 4S versions along with the standard rear-wheel-drive version in coupe, targa, and convertible body styles), Carrera T (only offered in the coupe body style with rear-wheel-drive), Carrera GTS versions (offered in coupe, convertible, and targa body styles with the optional all-wheel-drive available), the GT3 and GT3 RS (only offered in the coupe body style and rear-wheel-drive), the Turbo and the flagship Turbo S (only offered in coupe and convertible body styles with only all-wheel-drive).

911 GT1

The Porsche 911 GT1 is a race car that was developed in 1996 for the GT1 class in the 24 Hours of Le Mans. In order to qualify for GT racing, 25 road-going models were built to achieve type homologation. Both the road and race cars carried the same twin-turbocharged engine as used in the 962, and the race car was a match for the then-dominant McLaren F1 GTRs. A redeveloped version of the 911 GT1 race car was later built, winning outright at the 1998 24 Hours of Le Mans. The car is not considered to be a real 911, as it is derived from the 962 with the 993 and later the 996 911's front section. It was the most powerful and fastest road-going Porsche until the introduction of the Carrera GT in 2004 and later the 918 Spyder in 2013.

Awards
In 1999, the 911 placed fifth in the Global Automotive Elections Foundation's Car of the Century competition, trailing mass market cars: Ford Model T, BMC Mini, Citroën DS, and Volkswagen Beetle.

In 2004, Sports Car International named the 911 number three on the list of Top Sports Cars of the 1960s, the Carrera RS number seven on the list of Top Sports Cars of the 1970s, and the 911 Carrera number seven on the list of Top Sports Cars of the 1980s. In addition, the 911 was voted Number 2 on Automobile Magazine list of the "100 Coolest Cars". Motor Trend chose the Porsche 911 Carrera S as its Best Driver's Car for 2012. It also won "World Performance Car Of The Year" in 2014.

In 2015, Car and Driver named the Porsche 911 "the best premium sports car on the market".

Notes

References

Further reading

 Frère, P. (2006). Porsche 911 Story (eighth edition). J H Haynes. .
 
 
 
 Meredith, L. (2000). Porsche 911. Sutton Publishing. .
 Morgan, P. (1995). Original Porsche 911. MBI Publishing. .
 Raby, P. (2005). Porsche 911 Identification Guide. Herridge & Son. .

External links

 Official Porsche 911 microsite
 Official USA Porsche 911 page
 Official Porsche Evolution microsite
 Radio List for Porsche (1974–1989)
 Production videos: 
 

Cars introduced in 1964
911
Rear-engined vehicles
Rally cars
Group B cars
Sports cars
Coupés
Convertibles
1970s cars
1980s cars
1990s cars
2000s cars
Cars powered by boxer engines
Cars powered by rear-mounted 6-cylinder engines
Flagship vehicles
Group 4 (racing) cars
2+2 coupés